Aetheorhyncha is a genus of epiphytic orchids. It contains only one known species, Aetheorhyncha andreettae, endemic to Ecuador.

References

External links
IOSPE orchid photos, Aetheorhyncha andreettae (Jenny) Dressler 2005 Photo by © Madame Popow

Monotypic Epidendroideae genera
Zygopetalinae genera
Orchids of Ecuador
Epiphytic orchids
Zygopetalinae